The Botryosphaeriales are an order of sac fungi (Ascomycetes), placed under class Dothideomycetes.  Some species are parasites, causing leaf spot, plant rot, die-back or cankers, but they can also be saprophytes or endophytes.  They occur world-wide on many hosts.

The order was originally defined in 2006 to have only one family, Botryosphaeriaceae, but new taxonomic studies have added at least seven other families.

References 

 
Ascomycota orders
Dothideomycetes